Zabou Breitman (born Isabelle Breitman; 30 October 1959), or simply Zabou, is a French actress and director.  She is the daughter of actors Jean-Claude Deret and Céline Léger. At the age of four, she appeared in her first movie. Since 1981, Zabou has acted in dozens of roles in films, TV movies, and theaters. She made her directoral debut in 2001 with Se souvenir des belles choses, for which she won a César Award for Best Debut. In 2012, she participated in Rendez-vous en terre inconnue.

Personal life 
Zabou has two children with the sculptor Fabien Chalon: Anna (1990) and Antonin (1993).

Filmography

Actress

Director

External links

 
 Short biography (in French)

1959 births
Living people
French film actresses
French television actresses
French stage actresses
French film directors
French people of Russian-Jewish descent
French women film directors
20th-century French actresses
21st-century French actresses
French women screenwriters
French screenwriters